Prevention is the second studio album by Scottish indie rock band De Rosa, released on 2 March 2009 on both Chemikal Underground and Gargleblast Records. Regarding the album, guitarist Chris Connick stated that the album features "ten tracks of misery and place, from Lanarkshire," and noted that it "differ[ed] sonically from Mend quite a bit. The songs are more layered, and we used a lot more electronics and beats on this album. There’s also more emphasis on the album's coherence as a whole, and I think it plays better as a collection of songs than Mend did."

Vocalist and guitarist Martin Henry stated that: "the scratchy, falling-apart sound of parts of Mend frustrates me sometimes, so with Prevention I wanted to make something that was prettier and heavier at the same time. We were more interested in layers of vocals and instruments, with an emphasis on percussion, not just guitar. There are definitely a lot more keyboards on this one too.

The band worked with producer Andy Miller at Chem 19 recording studios in Lanarkshire, Scotland. Guest musicians on the album include Barry Burns of Mogwai and Robert Johnston of  Life Without Buildings.

Artwork
The album's front cover features artwork by Glasgow writer and artist Alasdair Gray. Guitarist Chris Connick notes that: Our friend Sorcha Dallas (and wife-to-be of Robert Johnson from Life Without Buildings, who played on our album) is an art dealer and gallery owner based in Glasgow. She helped put us in touch with Alasdair regards the cover art. Being a huge fan of Alasdair’s writing and in particular books such as Lanark and 1982, Janine, I was really excited and a bit scared when the sittings for the portrait came around. It was really cool to meet Alasdair and he turned out to be a lovely and engaging man, so I can thoroughly dismiss the adage "Never meet your heroes" as absolute bollocks.

Vocalist and guitarist Marin Henry notes that: The portraits were painted first, then there was the idea of a table with some meaningful objects.  The map and the copy of Mend came from Alasdair a little later on and I remembered there being an old map lying about Chem19, where we recorded the album. The guitar in the image is my little acoustic. I write all of the De Rosa demos on it.

Track listing 
Lyrics by Martin John Henry. Music by De Rosa.
 A Love Economy
 Nocturne For An Absentee
 It Helps To See You Hurt
 Pest
 Stillness
 Under The Stairs
 In Code
 Swell
 Flight Recorder
 Tinto

Personnel 
 Martin John Henry – vocals, guitars, organ, vibraphone, accordion, programming
 James Woodside – bass, mandolin, melodica
 Neil Woodside – drums, percussion, glockenspiel
 Chris Connick – guitars, synthesisers, piano, hammer dulcimer
 Andrew Bush – piano, guitar, synthesisers, melodica, vibraphone
 Alan Barr – cello
 Robert Johnston – additional guitar
 Barry Burns – piano, organ, synthesisers
 Andy Miller – producer
 Kenny MacLeod – mastering

The album also features choir vocals performed by a group of friends and family members of De Rosa.

References

External links
Official Website
De Rosa mySpace

Chemikal Underground albums
De Rosa (band) albums
2009 albums